The South Portland A-26 Invader crash was the worst aviation accident in Maine history.  It occurred in the historic Brick Hill neighborhood of South Portland.

On July 11, 1944, a A-26B-5 Invader of the United States Army Air Forces struck the ground during a foggy day. It cartwheeled through a government-operated trailer park, starting a fire. The aircraft's pilot and navigator were killed. In the trailer park, 17 residents were killed and 20 residents were injured.

Background 
Phillip "Phee" Russell had played basketball, baseball, and football at South Portland High School before graduating in 1939 to attend the University of Maine.  Russell married his high school classmate and sweetheart in June, 1943.  He was commissioned a United States Army Air Forces Second Lieutenant the same month and became a flight instructor at Barksdale Field in Louisiana.  A year later, Russell received permission to visit his wife and 3-month-old daughter in South Portland as part of a long-range training mission.

July 11, 1944 
Russell's family and friends gathered at the Portland airport to await his arrival in patchy heavy fog.  The airport officially closed at 1635 because of the fog.  Six minutes later, his family reportedly heard Russell's voice requesting landing instructions on the airport radio, and saw his A-26B-5 Invader appear briefly out of the fog at an estimated altitude of 200 feet.  The airport instructed Russell to climb to 1500 feet, and the plane disappeared into the fog.  Waiting for a radio response from Russell, airport observers saw flames and heard crash noises from the direction in which the plane had disappeared.

The aircraft struck the ground and cartwheeled through a government-operated trailer park housing families of shipyard workers at the New England Shipbuilding Corporation.  Sixteen trailers were destroyed by fire and a dozen more damaged by pieces of the disintegrating airplane.  Seventeen trailer-park residents died, and twenty more were injured.  The bodies of Russell and his navigator, Staff Sergeant Wallace Mifflin, were found in the trailer-park wreckage.

Memorial 
66 years later, the Long Creek Air Tragedy Memorial was erected to commemorate the crash and honor the victims.  A similar memorial on Deer Mountain, 100 miles to the north, marks the site of Maine's second-worst plane crash. Through coincidence, both crashes occurred on the same day.

The granite for the Long Creek memorial came from a quarry in Wells, Maine, the same quarry that supplied granite for the Tomb of the Unknowns in Arlington National Cemetery.

References

1944 in Maine
1944 in military history
Aviation accidents and incidents in the United States in 1944
July 1944 events
Buildings and structures in South Portland, Maine
Monuments and memorials in Maine
Aviation accidents and incidents in Maine
Accidents and incidents involving military aircraft
United States Army Air Forces